Guido Piovene (27 July 1907 –  12 November 1974) was an Italian writer and journalist.

Biography
Born in Vicenza into a noble family, Piovene graduated in philosophy in Milan and then devoted himself to journalism, notably collaborating with Corriere della Sera, La Stampa and Il Tempo. He took part in the anti-fascist resistance with the Movimento Comunista d'Italia. According to Felice Chilanti's daughter, he wrote the statutes for its youth association COBA (so named in homage to Joseph Stalin's youthful pseudonym).

His 1970 novel Le stelle fredde (The Cold Stars) won the Strega Prize. In 1974 he co-founded the newspaper Il Giornale with Indro Montanelli.

References

Further reading 
   
   
   
   
   
   
  
   
  

1907 births
1974 deaths
People from Vicenza
20th-century Italian novelists
20th-century Italian male writers
Strega Prize winners
Italian male novelists
Italian anti-fascists
University of Milan alumni